Juliana Couto Paes (born 26 March 1979) is a Brazilian actress and former model. She became nationally known in telenovelas and modelling. She also starred a local version of the musical The Producers, as Ulla.

Career

An actress, model and with a university degree, Paes became nationally known for her performances in "soap operas" of Rede Globo and for her looks. She was on the cover of Playboy magazine in May 2004.

In 2006, Paes was voted one of the sexiest one hundred people in the world by People Magazine. After that international projection, she hired an agent, showing interest in starting an acting career in the US.

Paes starred in many commercial campaigns, such as Colorama's and Hope's. Currently, she is the face of Arezzo for the second time and replaces the top model Gisele Bündchen as the star of the campaign for the jewelry brand Vivara.

Her debut as protagonist was the character Maya Meetha in the Brazilian telenovela Caminho das Índias

In 2009, she entered the select group of protagonists of the novel of the eight of Rede Globo when interpreting Maya, in Caminho das Índias, novel of Glória Perez winner of Emmy 2009. The actress starred in several advertising campaigns including Colorama and Hope. It was the advertising girl of the brand Arezzo and the jewelry brand Vivara. It was considered by Revista Época one of the 100 most influential Brazilians of the year 2009. On September 24, 2010, Juliana Paes debuted the program Por un fio at GNT. After the birth of her first child, Juliana returned to television in September 2011 in a guest appearance on the remake of the novel O Astro (2011 TV series).

In 2012, she starred in the episode "The Justice of Olinda" in the series As Brasileiras by Daniel Filho, playing Janaína, as well as the protagonist of the remake of Gabriela (2012 TV series), written by Walcyr Carrasco winner of Emmy 2016, under Roberto Talma and Mauro Mendonça Filho winner of Emmy 2011. In 2014, before even ending maternity leave, he accepted the invitation of director Luiz Fernando Carvalho Emmy nominated (2005,2014,2016), to star in the reboot of Meu Pedacinho de Chão, by author Benedito Ruy Barbosa Emmy nominated (2006,2017). Still in 2014, presents next to Márcio Garcia new version of the Golden Globe on Canal Viva. In 2016 she played the Carolina villain, in the telenovela Totalmente Demais Emmy nominated 2017, where she lived a loving square, alongside Marina Ruy Barbosa, Fábio Assunção Emmy nominated 2011 and Felipe Simas. In the year of 2017 it resumes its partnership with Glória Perez when living Fabiana Escobar known as Bibi Perigosa, in the telenovela  A Força do Querer of Rede Globo. The plot has reached high ratings, and its character has become very popular, winning many awards from the critics.

Personal life
Paes was born Rio Bonito, Rio de Janeiro. She is the oldest child of Regina Couto and Carlos Henrique Paes. She has three siblings: Mariana, Rosana, and Carlos Henrique Jr. She is of Arab, Portuguese, African, Native Brazilian, and Spanish descent.

On September 9, 2008, she married in total communion of assets with businessman Carlos Eduardo Baptista, at Itanhangá Golf Club, being considered the "bride of the year".

On December 16, 2010, her first son, Pedro, was born in the city of Rio de Janeiro. At the end of 2012, Paes announced her second pregnancy. On July 21, 2013, the couple's second child, Antônio, was born in the maternity ward of Barra da Tijuca, the same hospital where Paes gave birth to Pedro.

Paes is a big football fan, and in 2011 she publicly stated that she was a Vasco da Gama fan.

Filmography

Television

Cinema
2021 – Amor Sem Medida - Ivana
2013 – Casa da Mãe Joana 2 – Dolores Sol
2010 – Bed & Breakfast – Ana
2008 – Kung Fu Panda – Master Tigress (Brazilian dubbing)
2007 – Casa da Mãe Joana – Dolores Sol
2006 – Seus problemas acabaram – special guest
2005 – Mais uma vez amor – Lia

Awards and nominations

Los Angeles Brazilian Film Festival

Gramado Film Festival

Paulista Association of Art Critics

Prêmio Contigo! de TV

Prêmio Extra de Televisão

Prêmio Quem de Televisão

Internet Trophy

Troféu Imprensa

Melhores do Ano

Nickelodeon Kids' Choice Awards

Quality Award Brazil

ISTOÉ Trophy - Brazilians of the Year

Brazilian Society of Aesthetic Dentistry

References

External links

 
 
 Juliana Paes ׀ Gshow, TV Globo Brasil
 

1979 births
Living people
Actors from Rio de Janeiro (state)
Brazilian people of Arab descent
Brazilian people of Portuguese descent
Brazilian people of Spanish descent
Brazilian people of indigenous peoples descent
Brazilian people of African descent
Brazilian telenovela actresses
Brazilian film actresses
21st-century Brazilian actresses
People from Rio Bonito, Rio de Janeiro